Canute V Magnussen ( – 9 August 1157) was a King of Denmark from 1146 to 1157, as co-regent in shifting alliances with Sweyn III and Valdemar I. Canute was killed at the so-called Bloodfeast of Roskilde in 1157. Nothing certain is known about his person and character.

Biography
Canute was born around 1129, the son of Magnus the Strong and his consort Richeza of Poland. After the abdication of Eric III in 1146, the magnates of Jutland declared Canute king, while the magnates of Zealand and Scania crowned Sweyn III, the nephew of Canute Lavard who Magnus had killed in 1131.

In the following years, Canute tried in vain to defeat Sweyn III on Zealand for complete control over Denmark. In 1147, Canute and Sweyn united to undertake the Wendish Crusade, which however ended in the re-ignition of their strife. Sweyn and his cousin Duke Valdemar, the son of Canute Lavard, defeated Canute in Jutland in 1150, and Canute fled to his father-in-law Sverker I of Sweden. Canute attempted a number of reconquests, all of them unsuccessful, and turned to Frederick Barbarossa for help. The resulting compromise of 1152, which was supported by Valdemar, made Canute the inferior co-regent of Sweyn. However, Sweyn decided not to effectuate the deal.

Canute now formed an alliance with Valdemar and Sverker, whose daughter Helena Canute was to marry. Sweyn fled Denmark in 1154, and Canute struck a deal with Valdemar, making him his co-ruler. Canute was an inferior king to Valdemar, and after Sweyn's re-entry into Denmark, a final compromise was struck in 1157, under pressure from the Danish magnates. Sweyn, Canute, and Valdemar were set up as co-rulers, with Canute ruling Zealand. During the peace banquet in Roskilde on 9 August 1157, later known as the Bloodfeast of Roskilde, Sweyn attempted to kill both Canute and Valdemar. Canute was allegedly killed by one of Sweyn's warriors.

Canute's half-sister Sofia of Minsk married Valdemar, who avenged him the same year by killing Sweyn at the Battle of Grathe Heath to win Denmark for himself.

Issue
Not more than a year before his death, Canute married Helen of Sweden, but they had no children. Canute fathered two or three children out of wedlock:
 Saint Niels of Aarhus (died 1180); he lived as monk
 Valdemar; he was Bishop of Schleswig and Prince-Archbishop of Bremen
 Hildegard; she married Jaromar I, Prince of Rugia (possible daughter but uncertain)

References

1120s births
1157 deaths
Canute 1125
House of Estridsen
12th-century murdered monarchs
Christians of the Wendish Crusade
Year of birth uncertain
Year of birth unknown
12th-century kings of Denmark